A person having ordinary skill in the art (abbreviated PHOSITA), a person of (ordinary) skill in the art (POSITA or PSITA), a person skilled in the art, a skilled addressee or simply a skilled person is a legal fiction found in many patent laws throughout the world. This hypothetical person is considered to have the normal skills and knowledge in a particular technical field (an "art"), without being a genius. The person mainly serves as a reference for determining, or at least evaluating, whether an invention is non-obvious or not (in U.S. patent law), or involves an inventive step or not (in European patent laws). If it would have been obvious for this fictional person to come up with the invention while starting from the prior art, then the particular invention is considered not patentable.

In some patent laws, the person skilled in the art is also used as a reference in the context of other criteria, for instance in order to determine whether an invention is sufficiently disclosed in the description of the patent or patent application (sufficiency of disclosure is a fundamental requirement in most patent laws), or in order to determine whether two technical means are equivalents when evaluating infringement (see also doctrine of equivalents).

In practice, this legal fiction is a set of legal fictions which evolved over time and which may be differently construed for different purposes. This legal fiction basically translates the need for each invention to be considered in the context of the technical field it belongs to.

Canada 
The Patent Act (R.S.C., 1985, c. P-4) makes explicit reference to a "person skilled in the art" in the s. 28.3 requirement that the subject matter of a patent be non-obvious.

The person skilled in the art is described in Beloit Canada Ltd. v. Valmet Oy:
the technician skilled in the art but having no scintilla of inventiveness or imagination; a paragon of deduction and dexterity, wholly devoid of intuition; a triumph of the left hemisphere over the right. The question to be asked is whether this mythical creature (the man in the Clapham omnibus of patent law) would, in the light of the state of the art and of common general knowledge as at the claimed date of invention, have come directly and without difficulty to the solution taught by the patent.

European Patent Convention 

Still further, the Protocol on the Interpretation of  refers to the skilled person. Article 1, 2nd sentence, states that "[n]or should it [Article 69 EPC] be taken to mean that the claims serve only as a guideline and that the actual protection conferred may extend to what, from a consideration of the description and the drawings by a "person skilled in the art", the patent proprietor has contemplated".

The European Patent Office provides guidelines that set forth some of the skilled person's capabilities.

A related concept is the "business person", who is also a notional person. It is used at the EPO when assessing inventive step of an invention involving both technical and non-technical elements. The business person "represents an abstraction or shorthand for a separation of business considerations from technical".

United States 
A person having ordinary skill in the art is a legal fiction first codified in the Patent Act of 1952. The PHOSITA is a test of "obviousness" which is one of the largest gray areas in patent law.

The PHOSITA appears again in slightly different words in the provision requiring a proper disclosure:

Comparison 
Quite similar to the logic of "reasonable person" used in the common law of torts as a test of negligence, the PHOSITA is a hypothetical individual, neither a genius nor a layperson, created in the mind of a patent examiner or the jury to see if a claimed invention is too obvious to be patented.

Creation 
During the examination of a patent application, the examiner tries to find out if that invention has already been invented by another person. If so, the patent application will be returned to the applicant to be narrowed or modified. If not, the examiner will bring out the PHOSITA test to check if that invention is so obvious that people in the trade will invent it with or without patent applicant's efforts. In the end, if the examiner can not discover a piece of prior art that may lead the PHOSITA to the invention, the United States Patent and Trademark Office (USPTO) is required by statute to award that applicant a patent.

It is well known that it may take a few months or a couple of years for a paper to be published in a peer reviewed academic journal. The date of a sanctioned prior art can be a little later than the patent's application date:

Capacity 
The term "ordinary skill" is not rigidly defined.

 Factors that may be considered in determining level of ordinary skill in the art include
 the educational level of the inventor;
 type of problems encountered in the art;
 prior art solutions to those problems;
 rapidity with which innovations are made;
 sophistication of the technology; and
 educational level of active workers in the field.

KSR v. Teleflex 

The Supreme Court reversed a decision by the Court of Appeals for the Federal Circuit based on how the lower court defined the capabilities of a PHOSITA.  KSR v. Teleflex was decided by a unanimous Supreme Court on April 30, 2007.

Importantly, Justice Anthony Kennedy's opinion stated, "A person of ordinary skill is also a person of ordinary creativity, not an automaton."  Although the Court's opinion acknowledged other Federal Circuit cases that described a PHOSITA as having "common sense" and who could find motivation "implicitly in the prior art," Kennedy emphasized that his opinion was directed at correcting the "errors of law made by the Court of Appeals in this case" and does not necessarily overturn all other Federal Circuit precedent.

Once the PHOSITA is properly defined, KSR v. Teleflex described how obviousness should be determined:

Elsewhere 
Practically all patent legislations disallow the patentability of something obvious. Hence, it is no surprise that the laws of other countries have similar formulations.

For example, the German Patent Act (Patentgesetz) requires that the invention "cannot be derived by a Fachmann from the state of the art in an obvious manner". The word Fachmann (an ordinary German word meaning somebody who has professional knowledge in a field) is made specific by ständiger Rechtsprechung (usual court opinion) as a "specialist with average knowledge and talent whom one would ordinarily ask to seek a solution for the (objective) problem the invention deals with"

Decoupling
It is commonly assumed that the PHOSITA (or its European equivalent) in the non-obviousness provision and in the disclosure provision are the same person. Raising the non-obviousness bar (as has been proposed by people concerned about "trivial patents" being granted) therefore implies that the requirements for disclosure are lowered: if more inventions are considered "trivial", the PHOSITA is apparently considered smarter, so they do not need an elaborate disclosure. Some writers therefore have proposed to "decouple" the PHOSITA.

See also
 The man on the Bondi tram
 Objective historian

References

External links
 : "Person skilled in the art"
  M.P.E.P. Section 2141, Examination Guidelines for Determining Obviousness Under 35 U.S.C. 103

Legal fictions
Patent law